On November 3, 2016, around 240 people were killed in two migrant boat capsizing incidents off the coast of Libya. Twenty-nine people survived the first wreck, with about 120 deaths reported. Only two people survived the second wreck, and again around 120 deaths were reported. Another one hundred people are believed to have drowned off the coast when their boat sank after they were abandoned off Libya without a motor on 17 November. Twenty-seven survivors have been transported to Italy. An  estimated 4,700 people have died trying to cross the Mediterranean Sea in 2016.

See also
 Timeline of the European migrant crisis
 2016 Egypt migrant shipwreck

References

2016 in Libya
Migrant shipwreck
Maritime incidents in Libya
November 2016 events in Africa
Transport disasters involving refugees of the Arab Winter (2011–present)

Migrant boat disasters in the Mediterranean Sea